Club Spiel und Sport Bremen was a German association football club established on 10 July 1896 at the Restaurant Wartburghalle in the Free Hanseatic City of Bremen.

The club was a founding member of the VBFB (Verbandes Bremer Fußball-Vereine or Federation of Bremen Football Clubs) in 1899 and, a year later in Leipzig, was also one of the original clubs of the DFB (Deutscher Fußball Bund or German Football Association). The club fielded strong sides early on, finishing third among nine clubs in their first year of play. SuS was vice-champion behind Bremer SC 1891 the next season and repeated as runners-up in 1905. Their fortunes then declined from that point on until the club eventually folded after a last place finish in 1909.

Defunct football clubs in Germany
Club SuS 1896 Bremen
Sport in Bremen (city)
Association football clubs established in 1896
1896 establishments in Germany
1909 disestablishments in Germany
Association football clubs disestablished in 1909
Football clubs in Germany